Gondomar Sport Club is a Portuguese football club based in Gondomar, Porto District. Founded on 1 May 1921, it currently plays in the fourth-tier Campeonato de Portugal, holding home games at Estádio de São Miguel, with a capacity of 2.450 spectators.

History
Gondomar's early foundations were established on 1 August 1928, as the club registered in the Porto Football Association. In 1932, however, it ceased all activity, until a group of people dubbed Os Teimosos de Gondomar (Stubborn), ten years later, took it upon themselves to resurrect the club, which return to organized football in 1960, in the third regional division; promotion to the second regional level was achieved five years later.

In 1970, Gondomar moved to the new Estádio de São Miguel. On 27 October 1986, the team participated for the first time in the Portuguese Cup, losing 1–2 at F.C. Marco. In 2003, whilst competing in the third division, it made nationwide headlines after eliminating Benfica in the fourth round, with a 1–0 win at the Estádio da Luz.

One year later, Gondomar reached the second level for the first time in its history. In the 2006–07 season, the club achieved its best-ever classification in the category, finishing fifth.

In 2009, after ranking 16th and last, Gondomar returned to the third level.

League and cup history

Honours
Third Division: 2003–04

Managers
 Fernando Pires

Stadium

Logo history

See also
Apito Dourado

References

External links
Official website  (archived 23 March 2013)
Gondomar S.C. at Zerozero

 
Football clubs in Portugal
Association football clubs established in 1921
1921 establishments in Portugal
Sport in Gondomar, Portugal
Liga Portugal 2 clubs